The University of San Francisco Maritime Law Journal is a biannual law review that includes an annual survey of United States Court of Appeals for the Ninth Circuit cases pertaining to admiralty and maritime law.

Overview 
The journal was established in 1989 and sponsors two teams each spring to compete in the Judge John R. Brown National Admiralty Moot Court Competition. In 1999 and 2007, the journal hosted the competition at the Ninth Circuit Court of Appeals in San Francisco.

Articles 
The journal has been cited by numerous US state and federal courts. The US Supreme Court has also cited the journal, most recently in Chandris, Inc. v. Latsis.

References

External links 
 

American law journals
United States admiralty law
Maritime Law Journal
Biannual journals
Publications established in 1989
Law journals edited by students
English-language journals
Law in the San Francisco Bay Area